The 2010–11 Coupe de la Ligue was the 17th edition of the French league cup competition. The defending champions were Marseille, who defeated Bordeaux 3–1 in the 2009–10 edition of the final. The competition was organized by the Ligue de Football Professionnel and was open to the forty-four professional clubs in France that are managed by the organization. The final was contested on 23 April 2011 at the Stade de France. The winner of the competition qualified for the 2011–12 UEFA Europa League and will be inserted into the third qualifying round.

Marseille successfully defended its title after defeating Montpellier 1–0 courtesy of a second half goal from Taye Taiwo in the final. The title resulted in Marseille becoming the first club in Coupe de la Ligue history to repeat as champions.

News
On 20 August 2010, the Ligue de Football Professionnel confirmed that the Coupe de la Ligue would utilize the five-referee system that is currently being used in the UEFA Champions League and the UEFA Europa League. The announcement makes the Coupe de la Ligue the first national cup competition in Europe to adopt the system and was approved by the International Football Association Board (IFAB) on 21 July. The system officially began on 24 August with the start of the second round matches and will be in place until the final in April 2011.

Calendar

First round
The draw for the first and second round of the 2010–11 edition of the Coupe de la Ligue was completed on 8 July 2010. The first round featured 24 clubs; the four professional clubs that are currently playing in the Championnat National, the third division of French football, and the 20 clubs that are playing in Ligue 2. The matches were played on 30–31 July. SC Bastia and RC Strasbourg's participation in the competition was initially on hold pending approval from the DNCG, however, once each club met the organization's financial and administrative criteria, they were allowed entrance. Due to the unavailability of Évian's temporary stadium, Parc des Sports, the Évian–Strasbourg match was moved to the Stade de la Meinau in Strasbourg.

Source: Ligue de Football Professionnel

Second round
The draw for the second round of the 2010–11 edition of the Coupe de la Ligue was held on 2 August 2010. The second round featured the 12 winning teams from the first round. The matches were played on 24 August.

Source: Ligue de Football Professionnel

Third round
The draw for the third round of the 2010–11 edition of the Coupe de la Ligue was held on 30 August 2010. The third round featured the six winning teams from the second round and the 14 teams from Ligue 1 who didn't qualify for European competition this season. The matches were played on 21–22 September 2010.

Source: Ligue de Football Professionnel

Round of 16
The draw for the Round of 16 of the 2010–11 edition of the Coupe de la Ligue was held on 28 September 2010. The round featured the ten winning teams from the third round and the six teams that qualified for European competition in the 2009–10 season. The matches were played on 26–27 October.

Source: Ligue de Football Professionnel

Quarterfinals

Semi-finals

Final

Statistics

Top goalscorers 

Note: Players marked in bold are still playing in the competition.

See also
 2010–11 Ligue 1
 2010–11 Ligue 2
 2010–11 Championnat National

References

External links
 Official site 

France
League Cup
Coupe de la Ligue seasons